Dave Knight, nicknamed "Mule", was a Negro league pitcher in the 1930s.

Knight made his Negro leagues debut in 1930 with the Chicago American Giants.

References

External links
 and Seamheads

Place of birth missing
Place of death missing
Year of birth missing
Year of death missing
Chicago American Giants players
Baseball pitchers